Moss Landing, formerly Moss, is an unincorporated community and census-designated place (CDP) in Monterey County, California, United States. It is on the shore of Monterey Bay, at the mouth of Elkhorn Slough and at the head of the submarine Monterey Canyon.

History
The earliest residents of the Moss Landing/Elkhorn Slough area were the Ohlone people. Evidence from archaeological digs show that they may have lived here as long ago as 4,000 years. The Spanish forced the Ohlone into the mission system in the 1700s from which few survived. "A total of 81,000 Indians were baptized and 60,000 deaths were recorded." After the mission system was secularized, the Spanish government granted vast ranchos to soldiers and others with connections, including the  Rancho Bolsa Nueva y Moro Cojo. This grant extended from Moss Landing to present-day Prunedale and south to Castroville.

They farmed the land and ran cattle over the nearby hills. Americans arrived in the mid-1800s and farmers turned the area into cropland.

In the early 1860s Charles Moss, a Texas ship captain, established with the help of a partner a landing and wharf to handle the emerging grain trade in the Salinas Valley.

William B. Post earned a reputation as a skilled bear and deer hunter in the Big Sur region, and he traded in hides and buckskin. This work drew him north to Moss Landing. Post opened one of the first grain warehouses along the coast at Moss Landing. Flat bottom boats brought grain from all over the Salinas Valley to Elkhorn Slough and unloaded at Post's warehouse. W.B. became an agent for the steamship company of Goodall, Nelson and Perkins. The success of the shipping point stimulated the growth of Castroville, one of Monterey County's first municipalities, which served to support Moss Landing commerce.

The location was initially named "Moss", after Charles Moss. The Moss post office opened in 1895 and in 1917 changed its name to "Moss Landing". It became a busy whaling and fishing port and a location for fish processing plants and canneries. The Moss Landing Harbor District, established in the 1940s, dredged channels and built piers. The Moss Landing Power Plant opened in 1950. The California State University system founded Moss Landing Marine Laboratories in 1966 (it was rebuilt nearby after the Loma Prieta Earthquake destroyed the facility in 1989), and in the mid-1990s the Monterey Bay Aquarium Research Institute was moved to Moss Landing from Pacific Grove. In the 1980s, then-Monterey County Supervisor Marc Del Piero secured millions of dollars in federal grants to cure historic and chronic water pollution issues and sanitary sewers were installed.

Geography
Moss Landing is located in northern Monterey County, where Elkhorn Slough becomes an estuary as it flows into Monterey Bay at the head of the Monterey Submarine Canyon. California State Route 1 follows the eastern edge of the community, leading north  to Watsonville and southwest  to Monterey.

Climate
This region experiences warm (but not hot) and dry summers, with no average monthly temperatures above 71.6 °F.  According to the Köppen Climate Classification system, Moss Landing has a warm-summer Mediterranean climate, abbreviated "Csb" on climate maps.

Demographics

2010
The 2010 United States Census reported that Moss Landing had a population of 204. The racial makeup of Moss Landing was 149 (73.0%) White, 7 (3.4%) African American, 1 (0.5%) Native American, 2 (1.0%) Asian, 1 (0.5%) Pacific Islander, 30 (14.7%) from other races, and 14 (6.9%) from two or more races. Hispanic or Latino of any race were 46 persons (22.5%).

The Census reported that 204 people (100% of the population) lived in households, 0 (0%) lived in non-institutionalized group quarters, and 0 (0%) were institutionalized.

There were 100 households, out of which 21 (21.0%) had children under the age of 18 living in them, 36 (36.0%) were opposite-sex married couples living together, 11 (11.0%) had a female householder with no husband present, 4 (4.0%) had a male householder with no wife present.  There were 8 (8.0%) unmarried opposite-sex partnerships, and 0 (0%) same-sex married couples or partnerships. 41 households (41.0%) were made up of individuals, and 11 (11.0%) had someone living alone who was 65 years of age or older. The average household size was 2.04.  There were 51 families (51.0% of all households); the average family size was 2.76.

The population was spread out, with 32 people (15.7%) under the age of 18, 8 people (3.9%) aged 18 to 24, 54 people (26.5%) aged 25 to 44, 84 people (41.2%) aged 45 to 64, and 26 people (12.7%) who were 65 years of age or older.  The median age was 46.5 years. For every 100 females, there were 108.2 males.  For every 100 females age 18 and over, there were 115.0 males.

The homeowner vacancy rate was 0%; the rental vacancy rate was 8.2%.  118 people (57.8% of the population) lived in owner-occupied housing units and 86 people (42.2%) lived in rental housing units.

2000

As of the census of 2000, there were 300 people, 125 households, and 68 families residing in the CDP. The racial makeup of the CDP was 59.33% White, 3.00% African American, 0.67% Native American, 2.00% Asian, 21.67% from other races, and 13.33% from two or more races. Hispanic or Latino of any race were 28.3% of the population.

There were 125 households, out of which 27.2% had children under the age of 18 living with them, 39.2% were married couples living together, 14.4% had a female householder with no husband present, and 45.6% were non-families. 31.2% of all households were made up of individuals, and 8.8% had someone living alone who was 65 years of age or older.  The average household size was 2.40 and the average family size was 3.09.

In the CDP, the population was spread out, with 21.3% under the age of 18, 11.7% from 18 to 24, 34.3% from 25 to 44, 21.7% from 45 to 64, and 11.0% who were 65 years of age or older.  The median age was 36 years. For every 100 females, there were 117.4 males.  For every 100 females age 18 and over, there were 118.5 males.

The median income for a household in the CDP was $66,442, and the median income for a family was $66,731. Males had a median income of $41,154 versus $36,691 for females. The per capita income for the CDP was $28,005.  About 13.0% of families and 18.8% of the population were below the poverty line, including 38.7% of those under the age of 18 and none of those 65 or over.

Economy

Located in Moss Landing is the Moss Landing Marine Laboratories, a multi-campus research facility of the California State University.  Also located here is the Monterey Bay Aquarium Research Institute, a sister organization to the Monterey Bay Aquarium.

The Moss Landing Power Plant is a natural gas plant and the largest battery storage facility in the world. Located at the intersection of State Route 1 and Dolan Road.  It produces 2,538 megawatts, and is wholly owned by Dynegy.  It is visible from Santa Cruz, California to the north and Monterey, California to the south on clear days. There is a commercial park adjacent to the power plant, housing manufacturers and laboratories. 

While intended as a backup for California's marginal electric grid, the plant could only power the state of California for about two minutes. Three fires have occurred in the last several years, causing a shutdown of the plant and emission of toxic air pollutants from the burning lithium ion batteries.

Tourism is a large part of the economy in Moss Landing.

Arts and culture

Annual cultural events
The Moss Landing Antique Street Fair is held annually on the last Sunday in July and hosts hundreds of antique vendors. It brings over ten times the population of Moss Landing to the area.

Other events include the May opener for rock cod fishing, blessing the fleet May 1, open house at Moss Landing Marine Labs held in April or May, and Nautical Flea Market held in May.

Tourism

Moss landing is most noted as the gateway to Elkhorn Slough, one of the largest wetlands in the state. Elkhorn Slough is a precious resource and is always ranked in the top 10 best birding spots in the US according to the Audubon's annual bird count. There are over 350 species of bird that migrate through the area annually. It is also known as one of the best spots in the world to see sea otters. Moss Landing lies in the northern part of Monterey County and has numerous restaurants, galleries, a bed and breakfast, and is the home port to many fishing and pleasure boats.

Moss Landing Harbor District berths over 600 boats, including 350 fishing boats, 200 pleasure craft, 30 research vessels, and a half dozen tour and charter boats. The harbor's commercial boats land dungeness crab, halibut, king salmon, albacore, rockfish, sablefish, anchovies, sardines, squid, black cod,  red snapper, covina, prawns, mackerel, and others. Several maritime businesses support harbor users including a fuel dock. The harbor district also provides two public boat launches and a community park.

Moss Landing is home to the Shakespeare Society of America.

Parks and nature reserves
Moss Landing provides access to state and federal protected lands, including surfing destination Moss Landing State Beach, Salinas River State Beach, Zmudowski State Beach, Moss Landing Wildlife Area, and the Elkhorn Slough National Estuarine Research Reserve.

References

External links

 Moss Landing Chamber of Commerce
 Moss Landing Harbor District

Census-designated places in Monterey County, California
Monterey Bay
Populated coastal places in California
Census-designated places in California